Hollie-Jay Bowes (born 17 January 1989) is an English actress, known for her roles as Dawn O'Malley in the BBC drama Grange Hill and Michaela McQueen in the Channel 4 soap opera Hollyoaks.
In 2023, Hollie starred in two episodes of Waterloo Road playing suffering mother Debs Rafferty.

Life and career
Bowes' parents changed her name from Billie Jean to Hollie Jean as her father thought she would get bullied at school and be called 'Billie Bowes', and at 13, she changed her name to Hollie-Jay. In 2009, Bowes stated in an interview with Inside Soap that she is a distant relation to Hollyoaks co-star Tony Hirst, who plays Mike Barnes.

On 24 June 2010, Bowes announced on Twitter that she was fired from Hollyoaks after four years. In September 2011, Hollie-Jay reprised her role as Michaela McQueen in the series Hollyoaks Later and returned to the main series in October, but departed again in August 2012.

References

External links
 

Living people
1989 births
English soap opera actresses
English television actresses
Actresses from Oldham
21st-century English actresses